Shannon Park  is an urban neighbourhood and former national defence site in the north end of Dartmouth on the eastern shore of Halifax Harbour in the  Halifax Regional Municipality (HRM) in Nova Scotia, Canada. It is immediately south of the A. Murray MacKay Bridge in the community of Dartmouth. It straddles Highway 111, a CN Rail freight line, and Halifax Harbour. It is bordered on the south by Tuft's Cove.

History
Shannon Park, along with the adjacent former national defence site of Wallis Heights, housed the families of personnel serving with the Royal Canadian Navy. It was built in the 1950s to remedy the  shortage of housing which plagued sailors and their families in Halifax during World War Two. The community was named after HMS Shannon, the Halifax-based frigate which won a notable victory in the War of 1812.

With defence cutbacks reducing the number of personnel serving in the navy and expanded housing available on the civilian market, Shannon Park and Wallis Heights were closed in 2004 and remaining residents were moved to military housing at Willow Park. 

All buildings have been demolished as of 2018.

Immediately north of the neighbourhood on the Bedford basin adjacent to the MacKay bridge lies the Bedford Institute of Oceanography, a Canadian Coast Guard communication centre, and a Canadian Food Inspection Agency laboratory.

Until the HRM withdrew its bid for the 2014 Commonwealth Games, urban planners envisioned Shannon Park to be used for locating the proposed sports stadium, athletes' village and several additional venues. Disposal of the land is being negotiated between National Defence and the Canada Lands Company crown corporation.  Mi'kmaq from the Millbrook Reserve near Truro have applied for a portion of the land. Shannon Park now has a French immersion school.

Although unused, Shannon Park remains part of CFB Halifax. The Department of National Defence disposed of Shannon Park in three pieces.

Present
Also in 2014, the CLC bought  of land that includes an elementary school, at a cost of $313,000.

The Millbrook First Nation has an outstanding land claim on a portion known as Turtle Cove, which was the site of a former Mi'kmaq settlement.

A stadium for the Atlantic Schooners, the proposed Canadian Football League franchise, has been discussed as a location.

References 

Communities in Halifax, Nova Scotia
Former populated places in Nova Scotia
Urban decay in Canada
Canadian Armed Forces
Military history of Nova Scotia
Naval history of Canada
Dartmouth, Nova Scotia